Steffen Grummt (born 15 September 1959 in Wilkau-Haßlau, Saxony) is an East German decathlete who competed from the late 1970s to 1983. He later competed in bobsleigh in the mid-1980s.

Biography
As a decathlete, Grummt finished eighth at the 1980 Summer Olympics in Moscow. He also finished fourth at the 1982 European Championships in Athletics in Athens and eighth at the 1983 World Championships in Athletics in Helsinki. Following East Germany's boycott of the 1984 Summer Olympics in Los Angeles, Grummt switched to bobsleigh where he found better success.

In bobsledding, Grummt won a complete set of medals at the FIBT World Championships with a gold (Four-man: 1985), a silver (Two-man: 1985), and a bronze (Two-man: 1986).

Grummt is head of the sports school in Mainz, Germany. He is married to Kornelia Ender who won a combined nine medals in women's swimming at the Summer Olympics in both 1972 and 1976.

References
1982 European championships results
1983 World championships decathlon results.
Bobsleigh two-man world championship medalists since 1931
Bobsleigh four-man world championship medalists since 1930
List of top decathlon scores for 1982 
Timesonline.uk profile of Ender
Wallenchinsky, David (1984). "Track and Field, Men - Decathlon". In The Complete Book of the Olympics: 1896 - 1980. New York: Penguin Books. p. 117.

1959 births
Living people
People from Zwickau (district)
Athletes (track and field) at the 1980 Summer Olympics
German decathletes
German male bobsledders
Olympic athletes of East Germany
Sportspeople from Saxony